Balkh is a city in Afghanistan.

Balkh may also refer to:
Balkh Province, a province of Afghanistan
Balkh River, a river in Afghanistan
Balkh, Tajikistan, a town in Tajikistan, formerly known as Kolkhozabad